Satanas is a genus of robber flies in the family Asilidae. There are about 10 described species in Satanas.

Species
These 10 species belong to the genus Satanas:
 Satanas agha Engel, 1934 c g
 Satanas chan Engel, 1934 c g
 Satanas fuscanipennis (Macquart, 1855) c
 Satanas gigas (Eversmann, 1855) c
 Satanas minor (Portschinsky, 1887) c g
 Satanas nigra Shi, Y, 1990 c g
 Satanas niveus (Macquart, 1838) c g
 Satanas shah (Rondani, 1873) c g
 Satanas testaceicornis (Macquart, 1855) c g
 Satanas velox Lehr, 1963 c g
Data sources: i = ITIS, c = Catalogue of Life, g = GBIF, b = Bugguide.net

References

Further reading

External links

 
 

Asilidae
Asilidae genera